Daniel Fortea i Guimerà (28 April 1878 in Benlloc, Spain – 5 March 1953 in Castellón de la Plana, Spain) was a Spanish guitarist, composer, and music educator.

Biography

In his childhood, Fortea learned the clarinette, guitar and bandurria. From 1898 until 1909 he studied with Francisco Tárrega in Castellón de la Plana. His fellow students were, among others, Emilio Pujol and Miguel Llobet.

In 1909 Fortea founded in Madrid his own music school and began the Fortea Library, one of the most important collections of music for guitar.  He also concertized and wrote works for guitar. One of his disciples was Paulino Bernabe Senior, who became a noted luthier.

Works for guitar (incomplete listing)

 Alegrías sobre temas populares (1958)
 Allegro de concierto, Op.11
 Aquelarre, Op.32
 Balada, Op.47 (1947)
 Canción de Madre, Op.2 (1919)
 Capricho-Estudio, Op.13
 Cuentos infantiles, Op.12 (Canción de Cuna; Canción de Navidad; Marusiña)
 Danza de Gnomos, Op.23
 Danza de Muñecos de Carton, Op.31
 Elegía a Tárrega, Op.15
 En mi refugio, Op.42
 Estoy sólo!, Op.43
 Estudios poéticos, Op.25 (1929) (Dialogand; Serenata; Romance; Noche de Luna)
 Evacación, Op.16
 Hoja de violeta, Op.41, №1
 Homenaje a Sors, Op.46
 Impromptu, Op.17
 Improvisación (Gavota), Op.1 (1919)
 La Paxarina, Op.3
 Madrigal, Op.21
 Meditación, Op.24
 Murmullos, Op.27
 Nocturno, Op.33
 Pétalo de rosa, Op.41, №2
 Preludios, Op.37
 Remanso, Op.44
 Romanza, Op.7
 Sonatina, Op.20
 Suite espanola, Op.22 (Andaluza. Capricho; Solea; Granadina)
 Toledo, Op.14

Bibliography

 Antonio Pérez Llopis,  José Vicente Ripolles Daniel Fortea, la guitarra Castelló de la Plana: Diputació, 1989
 Daniel Fortea Méthode de guitare (Madrid: Biblioteca Fortea. Diverse editions)

References

External links
Daniel Fortea (1860 - 1947) Biography of Daniel Fortea from California State University. 2011.

1878 births
1953 deaths
19th-century classical composers
19th-century Spanish people
20th-century classical composers
20th-century Spanish people
Composers for the classical guitar
Spanish classical composers
Spanish male classical composers
Spanish classical guitarists
Spanish male guitarists
20th-century Spanish musicians
20th-century guitarists
20th-century Spanish male musicians
19th-century Spanish male musicians